This article lists the complete results of the knockout stage of the 2010 Thomas Cup in Kuala Lumpur, Malaysia. All times are Malaysia Time (UTC+08:00).

Bracket

Quarter finals

China vs Korea

Denmark vs Malaysia

Germany vs Japan

India vs Indonesia

Semi finals

China vs Malaysia

Japan vs Indonesia

Final

China vs Indonesia

References

Thomas Cup knockout stage